Cedar Mill may refer to:

 Cedar Mill, Oregon
 Cedar Mill, California
 Cedar Mill, Ashton-under-Lyne
 Cedar Mill, the codename of the Intel Pentium 4 processor